Katipunan station is an underground Manila Light Rail Transit (LRT) station situated on Line 2. It is the only underground station in the entire line.  The station is located in Loyola Heights in Quezon City and is named because of its location on Katipunan Avenue, one of Quezon City's main thoroughfares. The avenue is in turn named after the Katipunan revolutionary society.

Katipunan station serves as the tenth station for trains headed to Antipolo and the fourth station for trains headed to Recto.

This station should not be confused with the planned Katipunan station of the Metro Manila Subway Line 9, to be built on Camp Aguinaldo property near the other end of Katipunan Avenue, also in Quezon City.

The station was temporarily closed due to a fire which affected two rectifiers located between the Katipunan and Anonas stations on October 3, 2019. The station was reopened on January 22, 2021 after repairs to the rectifiers were completed.

Nearby landmarks
This station is located beside Philippine School of Business Administration. Because of its location near Katipunan Avenue, the station's famous landmarks are Ateneo de Manila University and Miriam College, both of which lie on Katipunan Avenue, but lie some distance from the station. Commuters also get off at Katipunan station to go to the University of the Philippines Diliman, which is also some distance from the station.

Transportation links
Buses, taxis, jeepneys and tricycles are used to navigate the Katipunan area.  Commuters headed to the area's universities, such as Ateneo de Manila, Miriam College, or University of the Philippines Diliman have to transfer to reach the campuses, since they lie some distance from the station.

See also
Manila Light Rail Transit System Line 2

References

Manila Light Rail Transit System stations
Railway stations opened in 2003
Buildings and structures in Quezon City